Salim Mawla Abi Hudhayfa was a Persian companion of the Islamic prophet Muhammad.  He was named so since he was the freed slave of Abu Hudhayfa ibn 'Utba, see Mawla.

He participated in the battle against Musaylimah as a standard bearer of the Muhajireen and  displayed unexpected valour. His people feared that he would show weakness or be too terrified to fight. To them he said, "If you manage to overtake me, what a miserable bearer of the Qur'an I shall be." He then plunged into the enemy ranks and eventually died in battle.

Muhammad is quoted as saying:
Learn the Qur'an from four persons: Abd-Allah ibn Mas'ud, Salim Mawla Abu Hudhayfa, Ubayy ibn Kab and Muadh ibn Jabal.

He had contributed in all major battles, such as Badr, Uhud, Ahzab etc., so he is a Badrian Companion of Muhammad.

See also
Islamic adoption
List of non-Arab Sahaba
Sunni view of the Sahaba

References

External links
Default Normal Template
Salim Mawla Abi Hudhayfah

7th-century Iranian people
630s deaths
Year of birth unknown
Arabian slaves and freedmen
Sahabah killed in battle